Thampanaikkulam, is a small town in Sri Lanka. It is located within the Mannar District, Northern Province.

The town was used as a relocation camp for Tamil refugees displaced during Sri Lankan Civil War.

See also
List of towns in Northern Province, Sri Lanka

External links

References

Populated places in Northern Province, Sri Lanka